This list of fictional birds of prey is subsidiary to the list of fictional birds. It is restricted to notable bird of prey characters from the world of fiction.

Books

Comics

Film and television

Animation

Video games

As mascots, toys, logos, and other

References

Birds of prey